Ian Gregson (born 1953) is an English novelist and poet. His debut poetry collection Call Centre Love Song was shortlisted for a Forward Prize in 2006. In 2015, he was put forward for the position of Professor of Poetry at Oxford University.

Biography

Born in Manchester in 1953, Ian Gregson was educated at Oxford University and completed a PhD at the University of Hull. In 1981, he was given an Eric Gregory Award by the Society of Authors. His debut poetry collection Call Centre Love Song was published by Salt in 2006, and was shortlisted for a Forward Prize for 'Best First Collection'.

Gregson has lived most of his adult life in north Wales, where he was Professor of English literature and creative writing at Bangor University until taking early retirement in 2015. He has published a number of critical books, largely concerned with contemporary poetry, postmodernism and representations of masculinity. His second poetry collection, How We Met, was published by Salt in 2008. The poem 'Squawks and Speech' from How We Met was chosen as The Guardian's Poem of the Week in July 2014. Gregson has also written two novels, Not Tonight Neil (2011) and The Crocodile Princess (2015), both published by Cinnamon Press.

In 2015, Gregson was nominated for the position of Professor of Poetry. Gregson later urged his supporters to vote for Simon Armitage, who was appointed to the role in June 2015. Coincidentally, Gregson had previously written a book-length introduction to Armitage for those studying him at school and university, built around detailed and accessible readings of his most important poems.

Sixteen of his poems have been translated into Chinese by Peter Jingcheng Xu who is also a poet, translator and scholar, completing his PhD at the School of English Literature, Bangor University in 2018. The poems and the Chinese translations together with the translator's Chinese review titled 'Ian Gregson: A Contemporary British Postmodernist Eco-Poet of Dramatic Monologue' are published by installment in the key journal The World of English from May to September, 2018.

Books

Fiction
 2011: Not Tonight Neil, Cinnamon Press
 2015: The Crocodile Princess, Cinnamon Press

Poetry
 2006: Call Centre Love Song, Salt
 2008: How We Met, Salt
2020: The Slasher and the Vampire as Role Models, Cinnamon Press

Criticism

 1996: Contemporary Poetry And Postmodernism: Dialogue And Estrangement, Palgrave Macmillan
 1999: The Male Image: Representations of Masculinity in Postwar Poetry, Palgrave Macmillan
 2004: Postmodern Literature, Bloomsbury
 2006: Character and Satire in Postwar Fiction, Continuum
 2007: The New Poetry in Wales, University of Wales Press
 2011: Simon Armitage (Salt Studies in Contemporary Poetry), Salt

As editor
 2010: Old City, New Rumours (ed. with Carol Rumens), Five Leaves

References

External links
Official website
Interview: Ian Gregson
Feature on Ian Gregson in The Crunch magazine
Ian Gregson and Omar Sabbagh at Kyffin - Cinnamon Press blog

21st-century English male writers
Alumni of the University of Oxford
21st-century English poets
Alumni of the University of Hull
Living people
Date of birth missing (living people)
1953 births
Writers from Manchester